Tom Long may refer to:

 Tom Long (actor) (1968–2020), Australian actor, born in the United States
 Tom Long (CEO) (born 1958), American President and COO of MillerCoors and former CEO of Miller Brewing Company
 Tom Long (pitcher) (1898–1973), Major League Baseball pitcher for the 1924 Brooklyn Robins
 Tom Long (outfielder) (1890–1972), Major League Baseball outfielder from 1911 to 1917
 Tom Long (politician) (born 1958), Canadian conservative strategist
 Tom Long (hangman) (died 1908), New Zealand government hangman
 Tom Long (Gaelic footballer) (born 1936), Irish Gaelic footballer
 Tom Long (racing driver) (born 1982), American racing driver
Thomas Warren Long

See also
 Thomas Long (disambiguation)